Pro-Pain is an American heavy metal band based in New York City, formed in 1991 by vocalist and bassist Gary Meskil and drummer Dan Richardson, both former members of Crumbsuckers.

History 
Their debut album Foul Taste of Freedom was released in 1992, displaying hardcore punk and rap metal influences, after which the band was signed to Roadrunner Records, who reissued the album the following year. Their second album The Truth Hurts was initially banned due to the sleeve artwork, featuring a picture of a stitched-up woman after an autopsy.

The band has released several more albums with a varying line-up over the years, with Meskil being the only constant member. The self-produced album Act of God saw the band signed to Nuclear Blast Records after they had relocated to Sarasota, Florida. The same label released Round 6 in 2000 and the live album Road Rage in 2001. In 2004, they released their first album for Candlelight Records, Fistful of Hate. Tom Klimchuck left the band in 2011 due to "unexpected circumstances regarding some potentially serious health issues." He had since been replaced by Adam Phillips of Indorphine, who stayed until 2019 when current guitarist Greg Discenza replaced him. On 3 July 2017, Gary Meskil was the victim of a robbery and attempted murder in Belgium while on tour with Pro-Pain in support of their 2015 album Voice of Rebellion. Pro-Pain remains active as of 2022, and they are currently working on their follow-up to Voice of Rebellion.

Band members

Current 
Gary Meskil – bass, vocals (1991–present)
Greg Discenza – lead guitar (2019–present)
Matt Sheridan – rhythm guitar (2016–present)
Jonas Sanders – drums (2012–present)

Former 
Tom Klimchuck – lead guitar, rhythm guitar (1991–1994, 1996–2011)
Dan Richardson – drums (1991–1997)
Nick St. Denis – guitar (1994–1995)
Mike Hollman – guitar (1994–1995)
Rob Moschetti – guitar (1996–1998)
Eric Klinger – guitar (1999–2007)
Dave Chavarri – drums (1997–1998)
Mike Hanzel – drums (1998)
Eric Matthews – drums (1999–2003)
Rich Ferjanic – drums (2003–2004)
JC Dwyer – drums (2004–2009)
Rick Halverson – drums (2009–2011)
Marshall Stephens – guitar (2007–2016)
Adam Phillips – guitar (2011–2019)

Timeline

Discography

Studio albums 
Foul Taste of Freedom (1992), Energy/Roadrunner Records
The Truth Hurts (1994), Energy/Roadrunner
Contents Under Pressure (1996), Energy/Concrete
Pro-Pain (1998), High Gain/Mayhem
Act of God (1999), High Gain/Nuclear Blast Records
Round 6 (2000), Nuclear Blast/Spitfire
Shreds of Dignity (2002), Nuclear Blast
Fistful of Hate (2004), Continental/Candlelight
Prophets of Doom (2005), Continental
Age of Tyranny – The Tenth Crusade (2007), Continental/Candlelight
No End in Sight (2008), Continental
Absolute Power (2010), Continental/Regain
Straight to the Dome (2012), Sunny Bastards/Nuclear Blast
The Final Revolution (2013), SPV Steamhammer
Voice of Rebellion (2015), SPV Steamhammer

Live albums 
Road Rage (2001), Nuclear Blast/Spitfire

Compilation albums 
Best of Pro-Pain (1998), High-Gain/Mayhem
Best of Pro-Pain II (2005), Candlelight
20 Years of Hardcore (2011), AFM

Tribute albums 
Run for Cover (2003), Spitfire

DVD
Raw Video (2001 (EU) / 2004 (US)), Nuclear Blast/Candlelight

References

External links
Official website
[ Pro-Pain] at AllMusic
Interview with Gary Meskil

Hardcore punk groups from New York (state)
American groove metal musical groups
Musical groups established in 1991
Nuclear Blast artists
American thrash metal musical groups
Heavy metal musical groups from New York (state)
Musical groups from New York City
1991 establishments in New York City